The Čakovec–Mursko Središće railway, officially designated L101 railway, is a  railway line in Croatia connecting the cities of Čakovec and Mursko Središće. The railway line links to the Slovene railway line to Lendava to the north of Mursko Središće.
In Čakovec, the railway also connects to the M501 to Budapest and Ljubljana and to the R201 to Varaždin and the rest of the Croatian railway network.

Route is non-electrified and single-tracked. The route was built in 1889 as Zalaegerszeg-Čakovec railway, but in 1945, after World War II, the route was dismantled between Lendava and Rédics. Slovenian Railways plans to rebuild the section between Lendava and Rédics.

See also
List of railways in Croatia

Maps

References

Railway lines in Croatia
Buildings and structures in Čakovec
Railway lime